Bathytricha is a genus of moths of the family Noctuidae.

Species
 Bathytricha aethalion Turner, 1944
 Bathytricha leonina (Walker, 1865)
 Bathytricha monticola Turner, 1925
 Bathytricha phaeosticha Turner, 1931
 Bathytricha truncata (Walker, 1856)

References
 Bathytricha at Markku Savela's Lepidoptera and Some Other Life Forms
 Natural History Museum Lepidoptera genus database

Hadeninae